Alastair Gourlay Biggar (4 August 1946 – 6 February 2016) was a Scotland international rugby union player.

He was capped twelve times for his country, between 1969 and 1972, including the Five Nations seasons of 1970, 1971 and 1972. In the 1972 game against , he sustained a hamstring injury. He also played for London Scottish. He toured New Zealand in 1971 with the British and Irish Lions. He died on 6 February 2016 from cancer.

Fellow London Scottish and Scotland player Mike Biggar is his cousin.

References

Further reading

External links
 Rugby Union: Action Replay: Paterson's late raid plunders victory in The Independent
 Obituary: Alastair Gourlay Biggar, rugby player in The Scotsman

1946 births
2016 deaths
British & Irish Lions rugby union players from Scotland
People educated at Sedbergh School
People educated at St. Mary's School, Melrose
Rugby union players from Edinburgh
Rugby union wings
Scotland international rugby union players
Scottish rugby union players